The Sun Shine 36 is a French sailboat that was designed by Tony Castro as an International Offshore Rule One Ton class racer and first built in 1982.

The Sunshine 36 is the production version of an original prototype one ton racer and shares a hull design with the Regatta 39 and the Sun Shine 38, which has a longer transom.

Production
The design was built by Jeanneau in France, starting in 1982, but it is now out of production.

Design
The Sun Shine 36 is a racing keelboat, built predominantly of fiberglass, with wood trim and a masthead sloop rig. The hull has a raked stem, a reverse transom, an internally mounted spade-type rudder controlled by a wheel and a fixed fin keel or optional stub keel and centerboard.

The keel equipped version displaces  and carries  of ballast, while the centerboard equipped version displaces .

The boat is fitted with a Japanese Yanmar diesel engine for docking and maneuvering.

The design has sleeping accommodation for eight people, with a double "V"-berth in the bow cabin, an "L"-shaped settee and a straight settee in the main cabin and two aft cabins, each with double berths. The galley is located on the port side just forward of the companionway ladder. The galley is "L"-shaped and is equipped with a two-burner stove, ice box and a double sink. A navigation station is opposite the galley, on the starboard side. The head is located just aft of the bow cabin on the port side.

For sailing downwind the design may be equipped with a symmetrical spinnaker.

Operational history
The boat was at one time supported by an active class club that organized racing events, the One Ton class, and more recently by the Jeanneau Owners Network.

See also
List of sailing boat types

Related development
Regatta 39
Sun Shine 38

References

External links
Photo of a Sunshine 36

Keelboats
1980s sailboat type designs
Sailing yachts
Sailboat type designs by Tony Castro
Sailboat types built by Jeanneau